James Bell (born 10 February 1999) is a professional  Australian rules footballer playing for the Sydney Swans in the Australian Football League (AFL).

Early life
Bell was born and raised in Shellharbour in the Illawarra region of New South Wales and is of Indigenous Australian heritage (Yuin). He grew up playing soccer and was linked to the Western Sydney Wanderers for a number of years as a teenager. He began playing Australian rules football at the age of 13 and was placed in the Sydney Swans developmental academy shortly after. When Bell was 15, he was given an ultimatum to choose between his two sporting interests and elected to pursue Australian rules football after attending a three-day training camp with his childhood idol - Sydney Swans player and two-time Brownlow Medallist Adam Goodes. Bell subsequently moved to Sydney and joined the club's academy program full-time. The decision paid off when the Swans elected to pre-select Bell as a Category B rookie during the 2017 AFL draft.

AFL career
Bell made his AFL debut for Sydney in 2019 in their round 21 fixture against Port Adelaide.

Statistics
Updated to the end of the 2022 season.

|-
| 2017 ||  || 32
| 0 || – || – || – || – || – || – || – || – || – || – || – || – || – || –
|-
| 2018 ||  || 32
| 0 || – || – || – || – || – || – || – || – || – || – || – || – || – || –
|-
| 2019 ||  || 32
| 2 || 1 || 1 || 9 || 5 || 14 || 7 || 5 || 0.5 || 0.5 || 4.5 || 2.5 || 7.0 || 3.5 || 2.5
|-
| 2020 ||  || 32
| 8 || 3 || 2 || 37 || 32 || 69 || 13 || 28 || 0.4 || 0.3 || 4.6 || 4.0 || 8.6 || 1.6 || 3.5
|-
| 2021 ||  || 32
| 12 || 2 || 2 || 38 || 37 || 75 || 24 || 25 || 0.2 || 0.2 || 3.2 || 3.1 || 6.3 || 2.0 || 2.1
|-
| 2022 ||  || 32
| 6 || 4 || 3 || 33 || 12 || 45 || 15 || 9 || 0.7 || 0.5 || 5.5 || 2.0 || 7.5 || 2.5 || 1.5
|- class=sortbottom
! colspan=3 | Career
! 28 !! 10 !! 8 !! 117 !! 86 !! 203 !! 59 !! 67 !! 0.4 !! 0.3 !! 4.2 !! 3.1 !! 7.3 !! 2.1 !! 2.4
|}

Notes

References

External links

1999 births
Living people
Sydney Swans players
Australian rules footballers from New South Wales
Indigenous Australian players of Australian rules football
People educated at Endeavour Sports High School
Sportspeople from Wollongong